Ruan Jacobs (born 30 June 1988) is a South African rugby union player, currently playing with the . His regular position is centre. He is the twin brother of Niell Jacobs.

Career

Youth

Senior career

References

South African rugby union players
Living people
1988 births
Rugby union players from Pretoria
Free State Cheetahs players
Leopards (rugby union) players
Border Bulldogs players
Rugby union centres